"Wearing and Tearing" is a song by English rock group Led Zeppelin. It is the eighth and final track on their 1982 compilation album, Coda. It was recorded at Polar Studios in Stockholm, Sweden, during the In Through the Out Door sessions on 21 November 1978.

Release and performances
Due to space constraints, "Wearing and Tearing" was one of three songs recorded at Polar Studios which were omitted from In Through the Out Door and later released on Coda, the other two being "Ozone Baby" and "Darlene".  The group considered releasing it as a special commemorative single in time for their performance at the 1979 Knebworth Festival, but this plan was abandoned because of time constraints.  The song was never performed at Led Zeppelin concerts, but Jimmy Page and Robert Plant played it at their Knebworth reunion in 1990.

Critical reception
Led Zeppelin biographer Dave Lewis sees "Wearing and Tearing" as a statement that the group could compete with the punk bands popular at the time. Ted Drozdowsk commented that the song was "Proof that when it came to energy and aggression, punk rockers had nothing on the Zep." In a contemporary review of Coda, Kurt Loder of Rolling Stone described "Wearing and Tearing", along with "Ozone Baby" and "Darlene", are "about as wonderful as hard rock & roll gets."

See also
List of cover versions of Led Zeppelin songs"Wearing and Tearing" entries

Notes
Citations

References

Led Zeppelin songs
1982 songs
Songs written by Jimmy Page
Songs written by Robert Plant
Song recordings produced by Jimmy Page